Dansha Airport  is an airport serving Dansha, a town in the Tigray Region of Ethiopia.

See also

Transport in Ethiopia
List of airports in Ethiopia

References

External links
OpenStreetMap - Dansha Airport

Airports in Ethiopia
Tigray Region